CR3 or CR-3 may refer to:

Science and technology
 Macrophage-1 antigen, an immunological cell surface receptor for a complement component
 CR3, an x86 microprocessor control register
 CR3, a raw image format used by Canon digital cameras since 2018

Transportation
 Cessna CR-3, a racing aircraft designed in 1933
 Curtiss CR-3, a racing aircraft designed in 1921
 County Road 3 (disambiguation), several roads
 Loyang MRT station, Singapore, station code CR3

Other uses
 The royal cypher C III R (sometimes written as CR III) for Charles III Rex (Charles III, King)
 Crystal River 3 Nuclear Power Plant
 CR3, a postcode district in the CR postcode area